Pekka Koskela (born 29 November 1982) is a Finnish speed skater, specialising on the sprint distances 500 m and 1000 m. He is the former world record holder on the 1000 m with the time 1:07.00. In December 2001 he set a junior world record on the 500 m with the time 35.89. Since that time he has established himself as one of the best speed skating sprinters in the world. He won his first medal, a bronze, on the 1000 m in the 2005 World Single Distance Championships. Koskela was number 10 in the 500 m of the 2006 Winter Olympics.

Koskela was one of the two dominating skaters at the 2007 World Sprint Championship in Vikingskipet, Hamar. He won both 500 metres, and set a rink record with 34.80, and was leading the proceedings up to the last distance, where he lost the world championship title to Lee Kyou-hyuk. Skating in the last 1000m pair, Koskela needed 1:09.03 to equal Lee, which by coincidence was the exact time Koskela achieved on the first day of the championships. Koskela was 0.14 seconds too late to become world champion, however.

Koskela has won four medals in World Championships. As of August 2013, he has won the 500 m 11 times and the 1000 m 3 times in the Speed Skating World Cup. He has been at the podium of World Cup competition 29 times altogether (500 and 1000 m) and he has been in the top ten 70 times at World Cup competitions. He has also two Finnish championship gold medals in track cycling.

Koskela's brother Pasi Koskela was also world cup-level speed skater, and he is now head coach of the Finnish national speed skating team.

Records

Personal records

World record 

Source: SpeedSkatingStats.com

References

External links 
 
 Pekka Koskela at SpeedSkatingStats.com
 
 
 
 
 Photos of Pekka Koskela

1982 births
Finnish male speed skaters
Speed skaters at the 2006 Winter Olympics
Speed skaters at the 2010 Winter Olympics
Speed skaters at the 2014 Winter Olympics
Speed skaters at the 2018 Winter Olympics
Olympic speed skaters of Finland
World record setters in speed skating
People from Mänttä-Vilppula
Living people
World Sprint Speed Skating Championships medalists
Sportspeople from Pirkanmaa